Heliophanus deformis is a jumping spider species in the genus Heliophanus.  It was first described by Wanda Wesołowska in 1986 and is found in Angola.

References

Endemic fauna of Angola
Salticidae
Spiders described in 1986
Arthropods of Angola
Spiders of Africa
Taxa named by Wanda Wesołowska